Katie Sullivan (born 16 March 1983), also known as Katie Kim, is an Irish musician, singer-songwriter and composer.

Personal life
Born in London to Irish parents, Katie Kim was brought to Waterford in Ireland as a child. In her late teens she moved to Dublin to attend university where she continues to reside.

Sound
Katie Kim performs atmospheric alternative folk rock music as a solo project, using a loop station and both classical and electric guitar. She also performs with as part of an ensemble, playing guitar, bass, keyboards and singing.

Music career
Katie Kim has released four studio albums, Twelve (2008) Vaults (2010)  Cover & Flood (2012) and Salt (2016). She most recently released a live album with Crash Ensemble where the collective reworked the songs of her previous album, Salt. They performed this in its entirety to sold-out audiences around Ireland between 2016 and 2018.

She has also composed a film score, an original soundtrack for The Seashell and the Clergyman. Commissioned by the Cork French Film Festival, Kim performed the score at the Pavilion, Cork in front of a live audience, where renowned director Agnès Varda attended.
 
On 15 August 2016 she released the track "Foreign Fleas" through her Bandcamp site.

Kim released her fourth studio album Hour of the Ox in September 2022.

She has worked with various musicians and bands, including Halves, Mike Scott and The Waterboys, David Kitt, Ed Harcourt and Radie Peat, a folk singer with the band Lankum.

Discography

Albums
Twelve (2008)
Cover & Flood (2012)
Salt (2016)
Hour of the Ox (2022)

Singles
"Radio" (2008)
"Heavy Lighting" (2012)
"The Feast" (2013)
"Foreign Fleas" (2015)
"Salt" (2016)

Film scores
The Seashell and the Clergyman (La coquille et le clergyman) (2011)

Appears on
The Nightsaver – David Kitt (2009)
It Goes, It Goes (Forever & Ever) – Halves (2010)
An Appointment with Mr Yeats – The Waterboys (2011)
Songs to Save a Life – Various artists (2012)
Final Witness (Episode 6: "A Mother's Revenge"/ Episode 7 – "What the Boy Saw")
Beekeeper – Steve Wickham (2017)

References

External links
Official Katie Kim website
Katie Kim Facebook page
Katie Kim Bandcamp site

1983 births
Alternative rock bass guitarists
Alternative rock guitarists
Alternative rock keyboardists
Alternative rock pianists
Alternative rock singers
Women bass guitarists
Living people
Irish film score composers
Irish folk musicians
Irish bass guitarists
Irish guitarists
Irish keyboardists
Irish pianists
Irish women singer-songwriters
Musicians from Dublin (city)
Musicians from London
People from Waterford (city)
21st-century Irish women singers
21st-century pianists
21st-century bass guitarists
21st-century women pianists